Libyan Desert glass or Great Sand Sea glass is an impactite, made mostly of lechatelierite, found in areas in the eastern Sahara, in the deserts of eastern Libya and western Egypt. Fragments of desert glass can be found over areas of tens of square kilometers.

Geologic origin 

The origin of desert glass is uncertain. Meteoritic origins have long been considered possible, and recent research links the glass to impact features, such as zircon breakdown, vaporized quartz and meteoritic metals, and to an impact crater. Some geologists associate the glass with radiative melting from meteoric large aerial bursts, making it analogous to trinitite created from sand exposed to the thermal radiation of a nuclear explosion. Libyan Desert glass has been dated as having formed about 29 million years ago. Like obsidian, it was knapped and used to make tools during the Pleistocene.

The glass is nearly pure silica which requires temperatures above 1,600 °C to form – hotter than any igneous rock on Earth. However, few mineral relics survived from whatever caused the melting, including a form of quartz called cristobalite, a rarely occurring high-temperature mineral; and grains of the mineral zircon, although most have reacted to form a higher-temperature mineral called zirconia. Ideas about how the glass formed include melting during meteorite impact, or melting caused by an airburst from an asteroid or other object burning up high in Earth's atmosphere.

See also

References

Literature 
 V. de Michele (ed.): Proceedings of the Silica '96 Meeting on Libyan Desert Glass and related desert events, Bologna, 1997 Contents
 P.A. Clayton / L.J. Spencer: Silica Glass from the Libyan Desert, Vortrag vom 09.11.1933 online

External links 

Google Scholar: "Desert Glass"
Glass in Nature from The Corning Museum of Glass

Glass in nature
Geology of Libya
Western Desert (Egypt)
Impact event minerals
Jewellery components
Rupelian